Conus niederhoeferi is a species of sea snail, a marine gastropod mollusc in the family Conidae, the cone snails, cone shells or cones.

These snails are predatory and venomous. They are capable of "stinging" humans.

Description
The size of the shell attains 35 mm.

Distribution
This marine species occurs in the East China Sea.

References

  E. Monnier, L. Limpalaër & F. Lorenz (2012): Phasmoconus niederhoeferi (Gastropoda, Conidae), a new species of cone from the East China Sea and notes on the Ph. moluccensis (Küster, 1838) and the Ph. proximus (Sowerby II, 1860) complexes- Acta Conchyliorum n°11.
 Puillandre N., Duda T.F., Meyer C., Olivera B.M. & Bouchet P. (2015). One, four or 100 genera? A new classification of the cone snails. Journal of Molluscan Studies. 81: 1-23

External links
 To World Register of Marine Species
 Cone Shells - Knights of the Sea
 

niederhoeferi
Gastropods described in 2012